The C. K. Dunlap House is a historic house located at 1346 West Carolina Avenue in Hartsville, Darlington County, South Carolina.

Description and history 
The house, built in 1934 and designed by Willis Irvin, is a two-story, five bay wide, rectangular brick Colonial Revival style residence. The façade features a two-story pedimented portico with balcony tier and four square columns. It was the home of Charles Kirkland Dunlap (1886–1972), prominent Hartsville engineer and executive at Sonoco Products Company.

It was listed on the National Register of Historic Places on May 3, 1991.

References

Houses on the National Register of Historic Places in South Carolina
Colonial Revival architecture in South Carolina
Houses completed in 1934
Houses in Hartsville, South Carolina
National Register of Historic Places in Darlington County, South Carolina
1934 establishments in South Carolina